Niwari Assembly constituency is one of the 230 Vidhan Sabha (Legislative Assembly) constituencies of Madhya Pradesh state in central India. This constituency came into existence in 1951, as one of the 48 Vidhan Sabha constituencies of the erstwhile Vindhya Pradesh state.

Overview
Niwari (constituency number 46) is a newly formed 52nd district in Madhya Pradesh state which is made from partitioning Tikamgarh district. This constituency covers the entire Niwari tehsil and part of Prithvipur tehsil of the district.

Members of Legislative Assembly
As from a constituency of Vindhya Pradesh:
 1951: Lala Ram Bajpai, Indian National Congress 
As from a constituency of Madhya Pradesh:
 1957: Laxminarayan Nayak, Praja Socialist Party
 1962: Nathu Ram Niwari, Praja Socialist Party 
 1967: L. Ran, Indian National Congress
 1972: Laxminarayan Nayak, Samyukta Socialist Party
 1977: Gauri Shankar Shukla, Janata Party
 1980: Ram Ratan Chaturvedi, Indian National Congress (I)
 1985: Ram Ratan Chaturvedi, Indian National Congress
 1990: Vikram Singh Ahir, Janata Dal
 1993: Brijendra Singh Rathore, Independent
 1998: Brijendra Singh Rathore, Independent
 2003: Brijendra Singh Rathore, Indian National Congress
 2008: Meera Deepak Yadav, Samajwadi Party
 2013: Anil Jain, Bharatiya Janata Party
 2018: Anil Jain, Bharatiya Janata Party

See also
 Niwari

References

Niwari district
Assembly constituencies of Madhya Pradesh